Kanna Nalama is a 1972 Indian Tamil language film, written and directed by K. Balachander. The film stars Gemini Ganesan and Jayanthi, with Major Sundarrajan, Manorama and V. S. Raghavan in supporting roles. It was released on 12 January 1972.

Plot

Cast 
 Gemini Ganesan as Anand
 Jayanthi as Seetha
 Major Sundarrajan as Sattanathan
 S. V. Sahasranamam as Sattanathan's Family Doctor
 Kumari Padmini as Santha
 M. R. R. Vasu as Manorama's Husband
 Manorama as K. Manorama
 V. S. Raghavan as Lawyer
Master Prabhakar as Mani
T. K. S. Natarajan as House rent collector
 Hari Krishnan as Doctor
 G. Dhanapal
 I. S. R.
 R. R. Gopal
 Gemini Mahalingam
 Aaraavamudhan
 Subbiah
 Thangaraj
 Master Sekar
 Master Ramu as Jayanthi's Son
 Master Viswesvar Rao as Mani

Production 
Kanna Nalama was Kamal Haasan's first film with K. Balachander, and dealt with the issue of "babies getting swapped".

Soundtrack 
The music was composed by M. S. Viswanathan, with lyrics by Kannadasan.

References

External links 
 

1970s Tamil-language films
1972 films
Films directed by K. Balachander
Films scored by M. S. Viswanathan
Films with screenplays by K. Balachander